Juan Velarde is a Spanish pilot who currently competes in the Red Bull Air Race World Championship. He has extensive amounts of experience with various types of aircraft and is currently Spain's top pilot.

In 2014 he joined the Challenger Class of the Red Bull Air Race. He was promoted to the Master Class in 2015, but he failed to score a point all season, finishing ahead of only fellow Master Class debutant and 2014 Challenger Class champion, François Le Vot. His 2016 campaign started strongly, finishing as the top qualifier in Spielberg.

Results

Challenger Class

Master Class 

*season in progress

Gallery

References

External links 

 www.juanvelarde26.es

1974 births
Living people
Spanish aviators
Red Bull Air Race World Championship pilots